CNB may refer to:

Businesses and organizations
 City National Bank (disambiguation)
 Central Narcotics Bureau, Singapore's primary drug enforcement agency
 Cherokee Nation Businesses, a conglomerate holding company fully owned by the Cherokee Nation
 City News Bureau of Chicago, a Chicago-area cooperative news agency
 National Ballet of Portugal, natively Companhia Nacional de Bailado
 Spanish National Center for Biotechnology, natively Centro Nacional de Biotecnología
 Czech National Bank (ČNB), the central bank of the Czech Republic
 In Black and White (CnB), a party coalition of Montenegro

Other uses
 Changi Naval Base, Singapore
 Chinbon, a dialect of the Shö language, ISO 639-3 code cnb
 Conjunto Nacional (Brasília), a shopping mall in Brazil
 Coonamble Airport (IATA: CNB), New South Wales, Australia
 Core needle biopsy, a type of breast biopsy
 Cosmic neutrino background, a type of particle radiation originating from the big bang
 Kanpur Central railway station (Indian Railways station code CNB), formerly known as Cawnpore North Barracks station